The house bunting (Emberiza sahari) is a passerine bird in the bunting family Emberizidae.

It is a resident breeder of dry country from northwestern Africa from Morocco south to Mali and east to Chad. In Morocco, the species has expanded from the Atlas Mountains northwards since the 1960s, and has recently reached Tangier  and Tétouan  on the southern shore of the Strait of Gibraltar. The house bunting breeds around human habitation, laying two to four eggs in a nest in a hole in a wall or building. Its natural food consists seeds, or when feeding young, insects.

It is 14 cm long, similar in size to the striolated bunting and smaller than the rock bunting. The breeding male has a sandy orange-brown body and a grey head slightly dark-streaked but without the white supercilium that the striolated bunting has. The female's head has a brown tint to the grey, and more diffused streaking.

The house bunting has recently been split from the closely related striolated bunting, of which it used to be treated as a subspecies, Emberiza striolata sahari. The striolated bunting has stronger facial striping and a paler belly than the house bunting.

The incubation period of the clutch of three eggs is 12–14 days.

The song, given from a perch, is similar to but weaker than that of the common chaffinch.

In Morocco, the species is traditionally regarded as sacred, and has become very tame, freely entering and feeding inside houses, shops and mosques.

References

house bunting
Birds of North Africa
Fauna of the Sahara
house bunting